Salix bicolor is a species of flowering plant in the family Salicaceae (willows).

Description
This plant usually develop into a large shrub, but may grow as a multi branched tree of up to 4 m height. Branches are glabrous. brown-reddish or chestnut. Leaves are yellow-green, glabrous, elliptical or lanceolate with acute apex. The catkins are produced in early spring, before the leaves. They reach 3 × 1 cm, on long peduncles with lanceolate bracts. Like all willows this species is dioecious. Flowers bloom from May to June.

Distribution
It is present in mountains of Southern Europe.

Habitat

References

Biolib
Flora de Aragon
Flora vascular

bicolor